Vietnamese people in the Netherlands form one of the smaller overseas Vietnamese communities of Europe. They consist largely of refugees from the former South Vietnam, Vietnamese born-citizens and their descendants (Dutch born-citizens of part or full Vietnamese origin).

History
The first Vietnamese boat people arrived in the Netherlands in 1977.

In the early 1990s, after the fall of communist regimes all over Central and Eastern Europe, a group of about 400 Vietnamese—formerly guest workers in Czechoslovakia—fled to the Netherlands and sought asylum there. By May 1992, 300 still remained. The Vietnamese government, although it saw the asylum-seekers as guilty of a crime for having fled, offered assurances to the Dutch government that they would suffer no discrimination if repatriated.

Demographic characteristics
, statistics of the Dutch Centraal Bureau voor de Statistiek showed:
11,960 Vietnamese-born persons (5,623 men, 6,337 women)
6,955 locally born persons of Vietnamese background (3,534 men, 3,421 women), of which:
1,027 persons with one parent also born locally (524 men, 503 women)
5,928 persons with both parents born abroad (3,010 men, 2,918 women)
For a total of 18,915 persons (9,157 men, 9,758 women). This represented 46% growth over the 1996 total of 12,937 persons. Most of the growth was in the locally born segment of the population, whose numbers more than doubled from 3,366 persons over the period in question; the number of Vietnamese-born showed more modest growth of 25%, from 9,571 persons.

Religion
A part of Vietnamese people in the Netherlands are Buddhists. Pagode Van Hanh is one of the official Vietnamese Buddhist temples in the Netherlands. The temple is situated in Nederhorst den Berg, a small village in Utrecht. The temple is from the association Stichting Vietnamese Boeddhistische Samenwerking Nederland. Around thousand Vietnamese families are named as members.

The two first parishes aimed at the Netherlands' Vietnamese Catholic community, the Allochtonen Missie van de Heilige Martelaren van Vietnam in Amersfoort and the Allochtonen Missie van de Heilige Moeder Maria in Deventer, were set up in 1994; at that time, there were estimated to be roughly 3,000 Vietnamese Catholics in the country.

Health issues 
Of the first 541 Vietnamese refugees who arrived in the Netherlands, 16.6% tested positive for the presence of Hepatitis B surface antigen (HBsAg). Intestinal parasites were also common.

Cuisine

Vietnamese loempia  
 

In the Netherlands a localised version of the Chả giò (or nem rán) known as the Vietnamese loempia is typically sold on every Dutch market and in many Dutch snackbars and supermarkets. These Vietnamese loempia's were introduced during the mid-1980s and are typically served with a special sauce invented for the Dutch market as Dutch people are unfamiliar with fish sauce.

References

Notes

Sources

Further reading

 

Asian diaspora in the Netherlands
Ethnic groups in the Netherlands
Netherlands